BCET may refer to:

Best-case execution time, a specific design parameter in real-time computing
BCET Gurdaspur, an engineering college in India